Natural bodybuilding is a bodybuilding movement with various competitions that take place for bodybuilders who abstain from performance-enhancing drugs. This categorically excludes the use of substances like anabolic steroids, insulin, diuretics and human growth hormone. If a bodybuilder meets the requirements of the sanctioning body (the recognized group or authority that sanctions and validates competitions) that they are competing in, then they are considered to be "natural".

Natural bodybuilding is a contentious point in the bodybuilding community because even without the use of performance-enhancing drugs, the amounts of food required to be eaten, training techniques, and body grooming are seen as abnormal undertakings for any athlete. There are also many athletes who claim to be natural but have failed drug tests in the past, and not all natural bodybuilding contests are subject to drug testing. There are numerous sanctioning bodies that provide their own rules and regulations that govern the competition procedures, event qualifications, banned substance lists, and drug testing methods. Doping detection methods include urinalysis and polygraph testing, and federations typically conduct these tests on the day of the competition, or shortly before. Each organization will specify within its rules the length of time that its athletes should be drug-free, which may vary from testing clean on the day of the event to being drug-free for a number of years, right up to a lifetime natural requirement.

Since natural bodybuilders avoid using steroids and other performance-enhancing drugs, they seek to optimize their training, diet, and rest regimes to maximize natural anabolic hormone production, thereby accelerating recovery and increasing hypertrophy and strength. Certain legal supplements may also be used to aid recovery and promote muscle growth, although diligence is needed as some over-the-counter products contain ingredients that are banned by natural bodybuilding organizations.

Definition
The notion of what counts as natural is a contentious point among bodybuilders and their practitioners. Bodybuilding sociologist Dr. Dimitris Liokaftos points to distinct differences between American and European bodybuilders. British attitudes towards nature place much greater emphasis on the notion of natural athletes adhering to the World Anti-Doping Agency's prohibited list by comparison to American drug testing policies where parts of the WADA prohibited list may be implemented.

References

Bodybuilding